The Honourable Henry Boyle Bernard (6 February 1812 – 14 March 1895) was an Irish Conservative Party politician from County Cork who sat in the House of Commons from 1863 to 1868.

Bernard was the third son of James Bernard, 2nd Earl of Bandon (1785–1856)  and his wife Mary Susan Albinia Brodrick.

Bernard was elected at a by-election in February 1863 as the Member of Parliament (MP) for Bandon,
filling the vacancy caused by the death of his uncle William Smyth Bernard (a son of the 1st Earl of Bandon).

He was re-elected in 1865, but at the 1868 general election he was defeated by the Liberal candidate William Shaw.

References

External links 
 

1812 births
1895 deaths
Younger sons of earls
People from Bandon, County Cork
Members of the Parliament of the United Kingdom for County Cork constituencies (1801–1922)
Irish Conservative Party MPs
UK MPs 1859–1865
UK MPs 1865–1868